Hiroaki Ohishi (born 13 March 1970) is a Japanese bobsledder. He competed at the 1998 Winter Olympics and the 2002 Winter Olympics.

References

1970 births
Living people
Japanese male bobsledders
Olympic bobsledders of Japan
Bobsledders at the 1998 Winter Olympics
Bobsledders at the 2002 Winter Olympics
Sportspeople from Hiroshima